The Seven-Per-Cent Solution is a 1976 Oscar-nominated British-American mystery film directed by Herbert Ross and written by Nicholas Meyer. It is based on Meyer's 1974 novel of the same name and stars Nicol Williamson, Robert Duvall, Alan Arkin, and Laurence Olivier.

Plot
Dr. John H. Watson (Robert Duvall) becomes convinced that his friend Sherlock Holmes (Nicol Williamson) is delusional—particularly in his belief that Professor James Moriarty (Laurence Olivier) is a criminal mastermind—as a result of his addiction to cocaine. Moriarty visits Watson to complain about being harassed by Holmes. Watson enlists the aid of Sherlock's brother, Mycroft (Charles Gray), to trick Holmes into traveling to Vienna, where he will be treated by Sigmund Freud (Alan Arkin).

During the course of his treatment, Holmes investigates a kidnapping case with international implications and Freud uncovers a dark personal secret suppressed in Holmes's subconscious.

Cast
 Nicol Williamson as Sherlock Holmes
 Robert Duvall as Dr. Watson
 Alan Arkin as Dr. Sigmund Freud
 Laurence Olivier as Professor Moriarty
 Charles Gray as Mycroft Holmes (a role he reprised in the Jeremy Brett TV series)
 Samantha Eggar as Mary Watson
 Vanessa Redgrave as Lola Devereaux
 Joel Grey as Lowenstein
 Jeremy Kemp as Baron Karl von Leinsdorf (he later played Dr. Grimesby Roylott in the Jeremy Brett TV series)
 Jill Townsend as Mrs. Holmes (Townsend was Williamson's real-life wife)
 Anna Quayle as Freda
 John Bird as Berger

Production
The film was made at Pinewood Studios with location shooting in the UK and Austria (including the Austrian National Library); the tennis match/duel between Freud and von Leinsdorf was filmed on one of the historic real tennis courts at the Queen's Club in West Kensington, London. The production designer was Ken Adam.

Stephen Sondheim wrote a song for the movie ("The Madame's Song") that was later recorded as "I Never Do Anything Twice" on the Side By Side By Sondheim cast recording.

Reception
The Seven-Per-Cent Solution was well received by American critics. 

Vincent Canby of The New York Times called the film "nothing less than the most exhilarating entertainment of the film year to date." Gene Siskel of the Chicago Tribune gave the film four stars out of four and called it "the classiest motion picture of the holiday season" and "a rare combination of money and brains." He placed it ninth on his year-end list of the best films of 1976. Arthur D. Murphy of Variety called it "an outstanding film. Producer-director Herbert Ross and writer Nicholas Meyer, adapting his novel, have fashioned a most stylish, elegant, and classy period crime drama." Charles Champlin of the Los Angeles Times wrote, "It is a particularly handsome period piece, beautifully staged and acted and most genuinely charming." Gary Arnold of The Washington Post called the film "an amusing, elegant, and unusually appealing adventure movie, a swashbuckler with literate, intellectual heroes."

British reviewers were more critical with The Times calling it "a turgid concoction which draws no life from the Holmes/Freud confrontation and seems particularly ill-plotted." The Daily Telegraph said "The tale drags on for reel after reel before we cotton on to the fact that it is meant to be funny." The Sunday Times said "the basic conflicts in Conan Doyle's original dissipate into whimsy, cuteness and slow, period-laden self-indulgence."

Mike Hale of The New York Times, after mentioning Robert Downey Jr.'s version of Sherlock Holmes, Benedict Cumberbatch in Sherlock and Jonny Lee Miller in Elementary, opined that Nicol Williamson's Holmes was "the father of all those modern Holmeses" claiming the film "established the template for all the twitchy, paranoid, vulnerable, strung-out Holmeses to come."

Awards and nominations

Home media
Shout! Factory released the film on Blu-ray on January 22, 2013 along with a DVD in the package.

Meyer appeared in an 18-minute interview for the Blu-ray release by Shout Factory. Meyer discussed the genesis of the idea (his father was a psychiatrist and Meyer was a fan of Holmes' creator Arthur Conan Doyle) and how he took the opportunity to write the novel when the Writers Guild of America went on strike.

Meyer revealed that he had often fought with Ross because Ross was too faithful to Meyer's novel. He believed that the script would not be cinematic enough if it was too faithful with the source.

He discussed the casting including his push for Alan Arkin as Freud. He shared a story about how he and Ross decided to cast Duvall "in revolt" against Nigel Bruce's portrayal of Watson as a "Colonel Blimp"-type character. Meyer and Ross wanted to try to capture Watson's intelligence that had so far not been portrayed on-screen in Holmes movie adaptations.

References

External links
 
 
 

1976 films
1970s English-language films
1970s historical adventure films
American historical adventure films
British historical adventure films
Sherlock Holmes films
Films about cocaine
Films about psychoanalysis
Cultural depictions of Sigmund Freud
Films directed by Herbert Ross
Films scored by John Addison
Films set in 1891
Films set in London
Films set in Vienna
Films shot in London
Films shot in Vienna
Films with screenplays by Nicholas Meyer
Sherlock Holmes pastiches
Films shot at Pinewood Studios
Universal Pictures films
Tennis films
1970s American films
1970s British films